Otto Smirat is a German judo athlete, who competed for the SC Dynamo Berlin / Sportvereinigung (SV) Dynamo. He won medals at international competitions.

References 

German male judoka
Possibly living people
Year of birth missing (living people)